Nemapogon scutifera is a moth of the family Tineidae. It is found in Greece and Turkey.

References

Moths described in 2007
Nemapogoninae